Roque Sáenz Peña was an Argentine politician; other uses might include:

 Roque Sáenz Peña Hospital, in Rosario
 Presidencia Roque Sáenz Peña, a city in Chaco Province
 President Roque Sáenz Peña Avenue, a main street in the San Nicolás quarter of Buenos Aires, Argentina
 Presidente Roque Sáenz Peña, a suburb of Buenos Aires
 Presidente Roque Sáenz Peña Department, a department of Córdoba Province in Argentina
 Pres. Roque Saenz Pena, an airport in Argentina (PRQ)